The Premier peintre du Roi (First painter to the King) was a court painter position within the administration of the Bâtiments du Roi of the Département de la Maison du Roi in France under the Ancien Régime. Its holder occupied a similar position to that of Premier architecte du Roi (albeit a far less prestigious one). The holder was not in charge of any other court staff, and the role was often without a holder.

Unlike other countries, the Premier peintre was often, even usually, not a specialist portrait-painter, but was always a native Frenchman.  The most famous holder, Nicolas Poussin, was persuaded to return to France in 1640 to take the office, but returned to Rome after a little more than a year.  Despite this, he held the position for another 23 years.

In contrast, his successor Charles Le Brun devoted most of his time to his work for Louis XIV, decorating his palaces and designing for and supervising the royal factories of the Savonnerie manufactory for carpets and the Gobelins Manufactory for tapestries and furniture.  Le Brun had a bitter, life-long rivalry with the portraitist Pierre Mignard, who finally succeeded him at the age of 78, but only held the post for the five years before he died.

Holders
 1603–1619 : Martin Fréminet 
 1627–1649 : Simon Vouet 
 1641–1665 : Nicolas Poussin 
 1664–1690 : Charles Le Brun 
 1690–1695 : Pierre Mignard
 1695–1716 : vacant
 1716–1722 : Antoine Coypel 
 1722–1725 : vacant
 1725–1733 : Louis de Boullogne
 1733–1736 : vacant
 1736–1737 : François Lemoyne 
 1737–1746 : vacant
 1746–1752 : Charles-Antoine Coypel 
 1752–1762 : vacant
 1762–1765 : Carle Van Loo 
 1765–1770 : François Boucher
 1770–1789 : Jean-Baptiste Marie Pierre 
 1789–1791 : Joseph-Marie Vien

References

 
Arts and culture in the Ancien Régime
Offices in the Ancien Régime